Events in 2006 in anime.

Events
In this year, 306 anime television programs were produced, and home video sales of anime DVDs and Laserdiscs in Japan were worth 95 billion yen.

Accolades
At the Mainichi Film Awards, The Girl Who Leapt Through Time won the Animation Film Award and Tekkon Kinkreet won the Ōfuji Noburō Award. The inaugural Japan Academy Prize for Animation of the Year was awarded to The Girl Who Leapt Through Time; other nominees were Arashi no Yoru Ni, Tales from Earthsea, Brave Story and Detective Conan: The Private Eye's Requiem. Paprika was in competition for the Golden Lion at the 63rd Venice International Film Festival.

Releases

Films
A list of anime that debuted in theaters between January 1 and December 31, 2006.

Television series
A list of anime television series that debuted between January 1 and December 31, 2006.

Original net animations
A list of original net animations that debuted between January 1 and December 31, 2006.

Original video animations
A list of original video animations that debuted between January 1 and December 31, 2006.

See also
2006 in Japanese television
2006 in Italian television
2006 in Serbia
2006 in animation
2006 in television

References

External links 
Japanese animated works of the year, listed in the IMDb

Years in anime
2006 in animation
2006 in Japan